Ravier is a French surname. Notable people with the surname include:

Daniel Ravier (born 1948), French football player
Gustave Ravier (1850–1918), French politician
Guy Ravier (born 1937), French politician
Jean-Christophe Ravier (born 1979), French racing driver
Stéphane Ravier (born 1969), French politician

French-language surnames